Josh Becker (April 13, 1969) is an American politician currently in the California State Senate. He is a Democrat representing the 13th Senate District, which encompasses most of San Mateo County and the northern part of Santa Clara County. Prior to being elected to the State Senate in November 2020, he was initiator of the Full Circle community organization and the CEO of Lex Machina.

Early life and education
Becker attended Williams College and Stanford University. During his time as a Stanford student, he cofounded a program called the Stanford Board Fellows, which trained students to serve in local nonprofit organizations and in social progress. He graduated from the university with a JD–MBA degree in 1999.

Career 
A year after he graduated from the university, Becker established the Full Circle community organization. The organization funds nonprofit and supported policy innovations and community organizations in economic opportunity, education, environmental sustainability and health.

Becker was appointed as part of the California State Workforce Development Board and Child Care Partnership Council in San Mateo County by Governor Jerry Brown. He served seven years on the board and council.

After his father's death from brain cancer, Becker founded a biotech company for cancer cure research. Becker also founded New Cycle Capital. He joined Lex Machina in 2011 and as its CEO, he made the company into a nationally recognized platform. In 2020, he found a legal tech accelerator that supported legal and public policy system innovators.

California State Senate 
Becker was elected to the California State Senate in the 2020 California State Senate election. He was sworn into office on December 7, 2020, replacing Jerry Hill who was termed out.

Becker appointed Bryan King as his chief of staff and Nicole Fernandez as his district director.

During the COVID-19 pandemic, Becker supported prioritizing teachers, early childhood educators and child care providers for early access to COVID-19 vaccinations, immediately after health care workers and vulnerable seniors.

Becker is a member of the Senate Climate Workgroup and has authored multiple climate action bills, including one that would require more frequent reporting by electricity providers on energy sources, another that would establish an earlier net zero goal for state agencies, and a few bills aimed at facilitating electrification.

Elections

2020 State Senate Election

References

External links 

 
 
 Join California Josh Becker

Democratic Party California state senators
21st-century American politicians
Stanford University alumni
Living people
1969 births
Williams College alumni